Bianca Halstead (May 5, 1965 – December 15, 2001), also known as Bianca Butthole, was an American rock musician, born in the Bronx, New York. She was the bassist and lead singer of the bands Betty Blowtorch and Butt Trumpet.

Halstead was killed when she accepted a ride from a drunk driver on December 15, 2001, in New Orleans. She was 36. Halstead is interred at Hollywood Forever Cemetery, Hollywood, California.

A substance abuse center, called "The Bianca Center for Substance Abuse," which opened in November 2008, is named in her honor.

References

External links
 
 L.A. Times article on Halstead's death
 

1965 births
2001 deaths
American punk rock bass guitarists
People from the Bronx
Road incident deaths in Louisiana
Burials at Hollywood Forever Cemetery
Women bass guitarists
20th-century American bass guitarists
Guitarists from New York City
American women guitarists
20th-century American women musicians
Women in punk